Adolf Weiler (1851–1916) was a Swiss mathematician.

Life and work 
After his studies in the Department of Mathematics Teachers of the Polytechnicum of Zurich, he went to study at university of Göttingen and university of Erlangen under Alfred Clebsch and Felix Klein. He was awarded doctor in 1874 with a dissertation on quadratic line complexes. Some years before, in 1872, he constructed a model of the Clebsch's diagonal surface.

Returned to Switzerland, he was mathematics professor at Ryffel Institute and he obtained the venia legendi both at Polytechnicum as the University of Zurich. His main research was in algebraic geometry.

References

Bibliography

External links 
 

19th-century Swiss mathematicians
20th-century Swiss mathematicians
1851 births
1916 deaths